The 2016–17 Championnat de France Amateur 2 will be the 19th season of the fifth tier in the French football league system in its current format. The competition will be contested by 112 clubs split geographically across 8 groups of 14 teams each. The teams include amateur clubs (although a few are semi-professional) and the reserve teams of professional clubs.

Teams
On July 15, the FFF ratified the constitution of the competition, and published the groups as follows:

 71 teams that finished in 3rd to 11th position in the 2015–16 Championnat de France Amateur 2 groups. The 72nd team, Châtellerault, were administratively relegated.
 3 teams that finished in 2nd position in the 2015–16 Championnat de France Amateur 2 groups, but were the lowest ranked 2nd placed teams.
 3 teams that finished in 12th position in the 2015–16 Championnat de France Amateur 2 groups, but were the highest ranked 12th placed teams.
 8 teams relegated from 2015–16 Championnat de France amateur after any reprieves (Sarre-Union, Troyes reserves, Aubervilliers, Roye Noyon, Sochaux reserves, Bayonne, Bordeaux reserves and Stade Bordelais)
 22 teams promoted from Regional Division d'Honneur (Lozère, Blois, Chamalières, Cozes, Créteil reserves, Avranches reserves, Fléchois, Furiani-Agliani, Grasse, Limonest, Louhans-Cuiseaux, Lunéville, Maubeuge, Ornans, Pau reserves, Prix-lès-Mézières, Quevilly reserves, Rodéo, Les Herbiers reserves, Senlisienne, Strasbourg Vauban and Vannes)
 4 teams reprieved from relegation from 2015–16 Championnat de France Amateur 2 groups. (Angoulême, Aubagne, Tourcoing and Lannion)
 The reserve team of new club Sporting Club Toulon, formed by the merger of Toulon-Le Las and Toulon.

On 9 August, the FFF confirmed the decision by Évian TG not to participate in the CFA 2 with their reserve team following the club's recent receivership. Because the decision comes after 15 July, there will be no replacement and Group F will instead operate with 13 clubs.

Eligibility for Promotion
The reserve teams in CFA2 cannot obtain promotion if their centre de formation (equivalent to Academy) is deemed of insufficient quality. The following teams are not eligible for promotion from CFA2 this season:

Group A
 Angers (res)
 Brest (res)
Group B
 Avranches (res)
 Quevilly-Rouen (res)
 Tours (res)
Group C
 Amiens (res)
 Boulogne (res)
 Paris FC (res)
Group D
 RC Strasbourg (res)
Group E
 Créteil (res)
 Dijon (res)
Group F
 Clermont (res)
Group G
 AC Ajaccio (res)
 Toulon (res)
Group H
 Les Herbiers (res)
 Niort (res)
 Pau (res)

SU Divaise legal challenge
SU Divaise finished 1st in DH Basse-Normandie, but were denied promotion due to not having a youth team. However this ruling was successfully appealed, however the decision was not binding on the FFF.

On 20 September the Tribunal Administratif de Paris (Administrative Court of Paris) upheld the decision of the Comité National Olympique et Sportif Français that SU Divaise should be promoted to CFA 2. This ruling gave the FFF 10 days to place SU Divaise into a CFA 2 group.

On 21 September the FFF published a revision to CFA 2 Group F, including SU Divaise in the group.

League tables

Season outcomes
Outcomes below are provisional and subject to ratification by the FFF.

Champions and promotion
Saint-Brieuc, Saint-Pryvé, Beauvais, Ste-Geneviève, Saint-Priest, Grasse, and Stade Bordelais are promoted to National 2 as champions of their respective groups.

Schiltigheim are promoted after finishing second in Group B, as champions RC Strasbourg reserves are ineligible for promotion. 

Le Mans, AS Saint-Ouen-l'Aumône, Furiani-Agliani and Limoges are promoted, due to having the best record of the 2nd placed clubs against the top five teams eligible for promotion in their respective groups. AS Saint-Ouen-l'Aumône were subsequently denied promotion by the FFF.

Saint-Brieuc are champions of 2016–17 Championnat de France Amateur 2, due to having the best record of the four promoted sides against the teams finishing in 2nd to 6th in their respective groups.

Relegation
Fougères, UJAM Paris, Marck, Forbach, Illzach, Strasbourg Vauban, Ornans, Cournon, Toulon (res) and Marmande are relegated to their regional Division d'Honneur.

Top scorers

References 

2016
5
Fra